One Shot is debut solo studio album by Danish hard rock singer Ronnie Atkins. It was released on 12 March 2021 by Frontiers Records.

Track listing

Personnel
Ronnie Atkins – lead vocals, backing vocals
Chris Laney – producer, arrangement, rhythm guitar, keyboards, backing vocals, acoustic guitar, lead guitar, solo guitar
Jacob Hansen – mixer, mastering
Allan Sørensen – drums
Pontus Egberg – bass
Morten Sandager – keyboards
Anders Ringman – acoustic guitar
Allan Sundberg – acoustic guitar
Pontus Norgren – lead guitar, solo guitar
Kee Marcello – lead guitar, solo guitar
Oliver Hartmann – lead guitar, solo guitar, additional backing vocals
John Berg – lead guitar, solo guitar
Jan Gripstedt – lead guitar, solo guitar
Allan Sundberg – lead guitar, solo guitar
Linnea Vikström Egg – additional backing vocals
Björn Strid – additional backing vocals

Charts

References

2021 debut albums
Frontiers Records albums